Typhoon Opal, known in the Philippines as Super Typhoon Naning, was an intense Category 5-equivalent typhoon in the extremely active 1964 Pacific typhoon season. Opal also had the largest wind circulation of any typhoon in 1964, with a total span of .Data from the Joint Typhoon Warning Center (JTWC) indicated that Opal's winds, along with Sally earlier in the year, were the highest of any typhoon in 1964. As the thirty-ninth named storm and the twenty-sixth typhoon of the season, it originated from a tropical wave in early December, with its wind circulation developing by December 8. This system quickly organized, gaining the name Opal, and reaching typhoon status on December 9. Opal moved through Yap and Palau for two days. On December 14, Opal passed north of some Filipino islands and its winds began to lose intensity. Opal weakened further as it moved over Luzon. Its center then executed a small counterclockwise loop over western Luzon before curving north and briefly emerging into Lingayen Gulf as a tropical storm. Opal crossed northwestern Luzon and the Babuyan Islands on December 16 and later became extratropical near Okinawa on December 17; this phase of Opal's development dissipated the next day.

Meteorological history 

Opal formed from a tropical wave moving through the Caroline Islands in early December, with an initial wind circulation developing by December 8. On December 14, Opal passed north of Catanduanes and Polillo Island and its winds began to lessen. The typhoon weakened further as it moved over Luzon. Its center then executed a small counterclockwise loop over western Luzon before curving north and briefly emerging into Lingayen Gulf as a tropical storm. Opal crossed northwestern Luzon and the Babuyan Islands on December 16 and later became extratropical near Okinawa on December 17; this phase of Opal's development dissipated the next day.

Preparations and impact 
Opal inflicted minor damage to a few homes in Palau, where winds reached an estimated . Tent homes in Angaur and Peleliu were inundated by storm surge. The Philippine Weather Bureau initially issued storm warnings for the eastern Visayas and Mindanao on December 13 in anticipation of Opal; these warnings were later extended to southern and central Luzon. Philippine Airlines cancelled all flights scheduled for the afternoon of December 14 and the U.S. military moved its Luzon-based aircraft to safety. Manila International Airport closed and railways were brought to a standstill. Some schools and offices in Manila were forced to close due to Opal's rains. The total cost of damage caused by Opal in the Philippines was estimated at US$25 million. Two people were killed and another three were injured in Virac, Catanduanes, after their house was razed by a landslide caused by torrential rainfall. Opal caused significant property damage in Luzon and disrupted communications. Rice crops were damaged by heavy rainfall, and together with coconut crops, sustained losses estimated in the millions of U.S. dollars. These crop losses were most severe in central and southeast Luzon. A washout led to the derailing of eight coaches on passenger train carrying 1,500 passengers in Quezon. Another train with 400–500 passengers collided with a goods wagon blown onto the tracks by Opal's winds, though no injuries were reported. A freighter was driven ashore by the typhoon at Jose Panganiban. In total, 26 people were killed and thousands of others were left homeless in the wake of Opal in the Philippines. The Philippine government designated 54 provinces and cities disaster areas. Rough seas from Opal off Okinawa swept two people off a ship stranded on a reef during a rescue operation, leading to their deaths.

See also 

 Typhoon Irma (Klaring; 1966) – a typhoon that took an identical track; sunk the Pioneer Cebu and Banca Alex.
 Typhoon Ivan (Narsing; 1997) – a very strong typhoon that took a similar track.
 Typhoon Zeb (Iliang; 1998) – a category 5-equivalent typhoon that took a comparable track.
 Typhoon Nanmadol (Yayang; 2004) – an intense typhoon that affected similar areas.
 Tropical Storm Choi-wan (Dante; 2021) – a tropical storm that also brought impacts in the Philippines.

References

External links 

 Digital Typhoon: Typhoon 196434 (OPAL) – National Institute of Informatics

1964 Pacific typhoon season
December 1964 events in Asia
Typhoons in the Philippines